Druzhne may refer to several places in Ukraine:

Druzhne, Crimea
Druzhne, Volnovakha Raion, Donetsk Oblast
Druzhne, Yenakiieve, Donetsk Oblast
Druzhne, Kherson Oblast
Druzhne, Khmelnytskyi Oblast
Druzhne, Luhansk Oblast
Druzhne, Rivne Oblast
Druzhne, Sumy Oblast
Druzhne, Vinnytsia Oblast
Druzhne, Bilmak settlement hromads, Polohy Raion, Zaporizhzhia Oblast
Druzhne, Orikhiv urban hromada, Polohy Raion, Zaporizhzhia Oblast
Druzhne, Zhytomyr Oblast